Brzostów  (German: Brzustow) is a village in the administrative district of Gmina Jaraczewo, within Jarocin County, Greater Poland Voivodeship, in west-central Poland.

The village has a population of 258.

Notable residents
 Waldemar Kraft (1898-1977), German politician

References

Villages in Jarocin County